Rudamina is a village in Vilnius district municipality, Vilnius County, east Lithuania, it is located only about  south-east of Vilnius city municipality. As of the 2001 census, the town had a population of 3937 people. The village has a Catholic church.

In 2010 the smaller village of Čekėnai was united with Rudamina, the combined village having a population of approximately 4300.

The village has 2 gymnasiums, Rudamina school of arts, 2 kindergartens, Vilnius district central library, post office (ZIP code: 13031).

References

Villages in Vilnius County
Vilnius District Municipality
Vilensky Uyezd